Since I Met You Baby is an album by Freddy Fender that was released in 1975.

Track listing
Since I Met You Baby
A Man Can Cry
Louisiana Blues
Crazy Baby
I'm Gonna Leave
Little Mama
You're Something Else for Me
Too Late to Remedy
Find Somebody New
Go On Baby (I Can Go on Without You)
The Wild Side of Life

References

Freddy Fender albums
1975 albums